Dwight Andre Sean O'Neil Jones (born December 19, 1962) is a former American football defensive end, who played for the Los Angeles Raiders (1984–1987), Houston Oilers (1988–1993), and the Green Bay Packers (1994–1996). He won Super Bowl XXXI with the Packers, beating the New England Patriots. Jones was selected to the Pro Bowl after the 1993 season. Sean Jones' brother Max Jones played college football at Massachusetts and later played professional football with the Birmingham Stallions in the USFL in 1984.

College career
Sean Jones attended Northeastern University, where he lettered for four years in football. At Northeastern he played on the offensive line his freshmen and sophomore seasons before flipping to the defensive side for his junior and senior season where he became a defensive presence.

Prior to attending Northeastern University, Jones graduated from the Montclair Kimberley Academy in Montclair, New Jersey where he played football, basketball and lacrosse.

Sean Jones became a member of the Nu Phi graduate chapter of Omega Psi Phi fraternity in Houston, Texas in 2004.

NFL career
Sean Jones played the first four years of his career as a Los Angeles Raider. In Jones' third year, 1986, he had a career high 15.5 sacks and 74 tackles. In 1988 the Houston Oilers traded the ninth overall pick in the NFL draft for Jones. Jones went on to play 6 seasons for the Oilers, amassing 50 sacks during this time. In 1994, Jones signed with the Green Bay Packers as a free agent. Jones formed a bookend at defensive end with Reggie White. Jones retired after the Packers won Super Bowl XXXI on January 26, 1997. During his three years with the Packers, Jones had 24.5 sacks.

Post NFL career
In 2001-2002 Jones was a reserve color commentator for the NFL on FOX.

In December 2003, arbitrator Roger Kaplan ruled that Jones violated National Football League Players Association regulations in his financial dealings with NFL player Ebenezer Ekuban. Jones received a two-year suspension, prohibiting him from representing NFL players until February 26, 2005. Jones later sued Ekuban and his attorney for slander and libel leading to Ekuban declaring bankruptcy in 2003. Former player Cris Dishman won a US$396,000 judgment against Jones involving a bad investment. Jones later counter sued Cris Dishman and his former wife Karen Dishman, the previous matter was declared settled and Jones received a money judgment against both Cris and Karen Dishman in 2006 for their part in illegally trying to extort more money from Jones.

In January 2016, he became a co-host for KBME Houston.

References

1962 births
Living people
Jamaican players of American football
American football defensive ends
Birmingham Stallions players
Montclair Kimberley Academy alumni
Northeastern Huskies football players
Los Angeles Raiders players
Houston Oilers players
Green Bay Packers players
American Conference Pro Bowl players
100 Sacks Club